The 1st LINE TV Awards was an awarding ceremony presented by LINE TV Thailand, giving recognition to the Thai online entertainment industry in the fields of music, television and drama for their achievements in the year 2017.

The awards night was held at the Royal Paragon Hall, Siam Paragon, Bangkok, Thailand on Tuesday, 20 February 2018.

Awards 
Winners are listed first and highlighted in bold:

Major awards

Special awards

References 

2018
Line
Line